The Unhealer is an American supernatural horror film written by Kevin E. Moore and J. Shawn Harris, directed by Martin Guigui, and produced by siblings Cristi Harris and J. Shawn Harris along with Tony Hannagan and Galen Walker. It stars Lance Henriksen, Natasha Henstridge, Adam Beach, Elijah Nelson, Branscombe Richmond, Chris Browning, Kayla Carlson, Angeline Appel, David Gridley, Will Ropp, and Gavin Casalegno.

The film follows a bullied teenager who gains supernatural powers from a botched faith-healing then goes on a revenge spree after a high school prank by his tormentors results in the unthinkable.

The Unhealer had its world premiere at Grimmfest film festival, Manchester U.K. on October 9, 2020. After a festival run, it was officially released on DVD, Blu-ray, and streaming platforms on June 8, 2021.

Plot 
Kelly has an unusual eating disorder called pica, feasting on inedible items like paper, Styrofoam, and erasers. Doctors can't help him. Classmates pick on him daily. His single mom Bernice is at her wits' end.

When his condition worsens, Kelly's mom hires a faith healer named Pflueger, who beforehand was confronted by Red Elk, a descendant from the tribe Pflueger stole the healing powers, to lay hands on a bedridden Kelly. The healing ritual ends in Pflueger's death but serves its purpose, and even more surprising, Kelly gains supernatural powers; any pain inflicted on him is instead felt by his aggressor. The next time one of his bullies, Reed, attacks him, for every punch landed on Kelly the bully bleeds and Kelly heals.

Out cruising the desert streets, his tormentors find Kelly riding his bike. They cheer as they tailgate and terrify him until Kelly hits a pothole and they run him over. As Kelly is crushed and dragged under the car, his powers transfer the injuries to the driver, Brad. Kelly yells, "Look what you've done!"

Kelly's classmates alienate him even more, except for the lovely Dominique whose affection for the newly confident Kelly grows. Meanwhile, he's confronted by Red Elk, who heard about the crash and suspects Kelly has the powers from his tribe.

But the bullies just cannot leave Kelly alone. They blame him for causing Brad's death and concoct a prank to settle the score by tying a chain to Kelly's house connected to their pickup truck, with Kelly inside. It goes wrong when Kelly leaves and Bernice stays home, and the truck causes a pipe to leak and start a fire. When Kelly gets home, he tries to save Bernice, but is too late, as she is already dead.

After the funeral, Kelly and Dominique confide in each other, which ends in a kiss. Kelly then decides to take revenge on the bullies, Nelson, Reed, Tony, and Tucker for killing his mom. After jumping out of the police chief Adler's car, he follows them to a lake, where he eats a piece of Tucker's shirt and ties the shirt around his neck, causing Tucker to start choking, and drown underwater. When Sheriff Adler questions the bullies, they say Kelly did it, though Adler believes they caused Tucker's death. When Dominique questions him about the incident, he comes clean, and she tells him to get them to confess to his mom's death rather than killing them.

Kelly doesn't listen though, and shows up to the bullies's chemistry class to taunt them. Eventually, despite warnings to calm down, Tony throws chemicals in Kelly's face, causing the injuries to be inflicted to him, and dies on the floor. When Sheriff Adler comes in, Kelly escapes, and Adler says all classes are shut down until Kelly is stopped.

Meanwhile, Nelson meets up with Sarah, Tony's girlfriend, to plot revenge. Sarah remembers seeing Kelly eat the plants on Pflueger's grave and vomiting profusely, so Nelson fills an extinguisher with the weed juice and plans to kill Kelly. Meanwhile, Red Elk and Adler, who are from the same tribe, get Pflueger's grave excavated, and Adler questions Nelson and Reed's dad, Coach Whitcomb, about the chains in his pickup truck.

Nelson then shows up at the football field to have a face off with Kelly. When Kelly asks Nelson to confess to his mom's death, he denies knowing about it, so Kelly, who had previously eaten Nelson's shirt, drills into his knees, inflicting the pain on Nelson, only stopping when Dominique arrives. Nelson sprays him with the plant, causing him to seize and vomit. Coach Whitcomb then steals the sheriff's gun, and shoots Kelly in the head, causing both him and Nelson to die.

Kelly finally agrees to have his powers taken away from him after all the harm he's done, so him, Dominique, Adler, and Red Elk start a ritual to banish the powers. However, more cops show up, though, and when Kelly runs, one shoots him and Dominique, killing himself as well. With Dominique dead, Kelly finds there is no more reason to live, and eats Pflueger's heart, causing him to convulse and die. Later, in an ambulance, Dominique comes back to life, revealing Kelly's powers to have been passed on to her.

Casting 

 Elijah Nelson as Kelly Mason
 Kayla Carlson as Dominique Lemieux
 Natasha Henstridge as Bernice Mason
 Lance Henriksen as Reverend Stanley Pflueger
 Adam Beach as Sheriff Bud Adler
 Chris Browning as Coach Gus Whitcomb
 Branscombe Richmond as Red Elk
 David Gridley as Nelson Whitcomb
 Gavin Casalegno as Reed Whitcomb
 Will Ropp as Tony Miller
 Angeline Appel as Sarah
 Cristi Harris as Terry Lemieux
 Thomas Archer as Brad
 Mike Gray as Tucker
 Kevin E. West as Dr. Fitzgerald
 Corbin Timbrook as Mr. Crowley
 Dahlia Waingort as Ms. Skinner
 Shelby Janes as Paulette
 Linda Rae Jurgens as Mina
 Craig Hensley as Deputy Ruddock
 Tommy Goodwin as Deputy McCarthy
 Dave Cobert as Paramedic Ross
 Dejzon Walker as Paramedic Carter
 Justin Dean Jones as Chucky
 Mike Hauser as Preacher

Release 
The Unhealer was officially released June 8, 2021 in the US and Canada on DVD, Blu-ray, and streaming platforms, and in theaters in South Korea December 2, 2021.

Reception  
On review aggregator Rotten Tomatoes, the film holds an approval rating of 83% based on 6 reviews.

References

External links 
 

2020 films
2020 horror films
American films about revenge
American horror films
American supernatural horror films
2020s English-language films
2020s American films
Films about bullying
Films about faith healing
Films about pranks